Me 4 U is the debut studio album by Jamaican singer Omi. It was released on 16 October 2015 through Ultra Music and Columbia Records. Three singles were released from the album: "Cheerleader" (remixed by Felix Jaehn), "Hula Hoop" and "Drop in the Ocean" (featuring Swedish DJ AronChupa).

The first single "Cheerleader" became a massive global success in 2015, reached number one in 20 countries, including the United States, the United Kingdom, Australia, France, and Germany.

Background and release
The first single "Cheerleader" was eight years in the making. Omi stated in an interview with Billboard, "I woke up humming the melody one morning when I was 21. It was like a little Jamaican nursery rhyme, like 'one, two, buckle my shoe,' that kind of thing – 'ring game' is what we'd call it. The rest of the song just fell into place like a jigsaw puzzle." He also stated "People are expecting 15 [versions of] 'Cheerleader,' but it's going to be pretty diverse, with a few features and songs written from different perspectives."

Critical reception

The album received mixed reviews from critics. David Jeffries of AllMusic stated, "Omi delivers this all in a wonderful voice, falling somewhere between roots star Tarrus Riley and Kevin Lyttle when it comes to Island authenticity, the singer turns to the same great guest Nicki Minaj chooses, dancehall singer Busy Signal, who kicks 'Color of My Lips' up a notch or two. 'Fireworks' is a sexy soca number that R. Kelly could cover, while the title cut is a warm and powerful duet with Sarah West, although she doesn't get a feature credit on the album like Busy, Erik Hassle, and AronChupa do, even though she certainly deserves one. For a rushed-to-market, crossover album capitalizing on a global hit, the pleasing Me 4 U is much more well-built, well-paced, and well-rounded than expected."

Annie Licata of Rolling Stone stated the best tracks on Me 4 U "are built for good times and warm weather, complete with steel drum beats and odes to the singer's island home ('The streets, they salute me/I'm home again,' he sings on the upbeat, heartfelt 'Promised Land'). 'Color of My Lips', which features a winning guest verse from Busy Signal, and 'Hula Hoop' match the catchy melodies and silky vocals heard on 'Cheerleader.' A few other highlights further the vibe of naive crushes and summertime fun. But Omi's attempts at darker love songs mostly fall flat. 'Standing on All Threes' is a woeful, surface-deep guitar jam. The title track leans heavily on a pallid R&B beat, and while Omi's vocals hit their notes, the song never catches fire. Most of his newfound fans would have a better time making a playlist with 'Cheerleader' 14 times in a row."

Commercial performance
Me 4 U debuted at number 51 on the US Billboard 200 chart, selling 9,000 equivalent copies (3,000 in pure album sales).

Track listing

Credits and personnel

Production

Omi – vocals, background vocals
Daniel Ledinsky – composer, engineer, producer
Ammar Malik – composer, vocals, vocals 
Andreas Moe – composer
Patrick Moxey – executive producer
Whitney Phillips – composer
Ash Pournouri – composer
Dann Pursey – engineer
Salaam Remi – additional production, composer, executive producer, producer
Omar Pasley – composer, producer, vocals
Carl Austin Rosen – composer
John Ryan – composer, producer
Nico Santos – composer 
Konstantin Scherer – composer, producer
Luca Schreiner – producer
Oscar Scivier – composer
Merrick Shaw – engineer
V*incent Stein – composer, producer
Xavier Stephenson – engineer, vocal engineer
Wim Treuner – composer
Jenson Vaughan – composer, vocals
Miles Walker – mastering, mixing
Dan Warner – guitar
Steve Mac – composer, keyboards, producer, vocals
Emily Warren – composer
Sarah West – composer, vocals
Karl Wolf – composer
Matthias Zürkler – composer

Charts

Weekly charts

Year-end charts

Certifications

Release history

References

2015 debut albums
Columbia Records albums
Ultra Records albums